Pool Edison Ambrocio Greifo (born 4 December 1990) is a Peruvian wrestler. In March 2020, he won the silver medal in the freestyle 86 kg event at the 2020 Pan American Wrestling Championships held in Ottawa, Canada.

Career 

In 2011, he competed in the men's freestyle 74 kg event at the World Wrestling Championships held in Istanbul, Turkey. He was eliminated in his first match by Ricardo Roberty of Venezuela. In the same year, he also represented Peru at the 2011 Pan American Games in the men's freestyle 74 kg event. He was eliminated in his first match by Matt Gentry of Canada. Gentry went on to win one of the bronze medals.

In March 2020, he qualified to represent Peru at the 2020 Summer Olympics in Tokyo, Japan at the Pan American Wrestling Olympic Qualification Tournament held in Ottawa, Canada. In the same year, he competed in the men's 86 kg event at the 2020 Individual Wrestling World Cup held in Belgrade, Serbia. In 2021, he competed in the men's 86 kg event at the 2020 Summer Olympics.

He won the bronze medal in his event at the 2022 Bolivarian Games held in Valledupar, Colombia. He won the silver medal in his event at the 2022 South American Games held in Asunción, Paraguay.

Achievements

References

External links 
 
 
 

1990 births
Living people
Place of birth missing (living people)
Peruvian male sport wrestlers
South American Games medalists in wrestling
Pan American Games competitors for Peru
Wrestlers at the 2011 Pan American Games
Wrestlers at the 2015 Pan American Games
Wrestlers at the 2019 Pan American Games
Competitors at the 2014 South American Games
Competitors at the 2018 South American Games
Competitors at the 2022 South American Games
South American Games silver medalists for Peru
Pan American Wrestling Championships medalists
Wrestlers at the 2020 Summer Olympics
Olympic wrestlers of Peru
21st-century Peruvian people